The Mongol invasions of Lithuania was an event where the Mongol armies invaded the territories of the Kingdom of Lithuania and later, the Grand Duchy of Lithuania, on several occasions in late 13th and early 14th century. The event was not very well documented, but historians knew also that despite occasional setbacks, which likely forced the Lithuanian state and its neighbors the Yotvingians to become client states of Mongols for a short period, the Lithuanians were able to take control of a number of formerly Mongol territories in the long run.

Lithuanian–Mongol conflict
The Lithuanians first made contact with the Mongols around 1237–1240, though for the next decade or two the Mongols did not consider Lithuanian-held territories a priority.

The first major incursion of Mongols from the Golden Horde under Burundai on the Lithuanian territories took place in winter of 1258. It was likely a reaction to Lithuanian incursions into Mongol-held territories. After raiding Lithuania and the Yotvingians, the next year, two tumens (20,000 men), under the leadership of Berke, attacked Poland (in what is known as the second Mongol invasion of Poland). 

The Mongol invasion of Lithuania in the years 1258–1259 is generally seen as a Mongol victory, as Lithuanian territories have been described as "devastated" following the Mongol incursion, in what was "possibly the most horrible event of the thirteenth century" for Lithuania. In the immediate aftermath of this invasion, Lithuania might have become a tributary or protectorate and ally to the Horde for several years or decades. A similar fate was likely met by the Lithuanians' neighbours, the Yotvingians. Some Lithuanian or Yotvingian warriors likely participated in the Mongol invasion of Poland in 1259, though there are no historical documents to clarify whether they did so with their leaders' permission, or as free mercenaries, or as forced troops.

Nonetheless, the invasion did not have major or lasting consequences for Lithuania, particularly as it was not directly incorporated into the Mongol Empire, nor subject to Mongol darughachi administration. Lithuanian defeat did however weaken the power of Lithuanian king Mindaugas who was eventually assassinated in 1263, which also marked the end of the short-lived, Christian Kingdom of Lithuania. The temporary shifting of the allegiance of its successor, the Grand Duchy of Lithuania, toward Mongols, or at least, away from the Christian Europe, was also a short-term victory for the Mongols.

Legacy
Mongols raided Lithuania again in 1275, 1279, and 1325.

Overall, the Mongols did not make any major effort to conquer Lithuania. In time, the Grand Duchy of Lithuania became a rival to the Golden Horde, temporarily taking over some of the former Kievan Rus' territories controlled by the Mongols as the Horde became weakened in the 13th and 14th centuries, though it lacked manpower to threaten Mongol territories outside of northeastern Europe.

See also
Mongol invasion of Europe

References

Lithuania
Wars involving the Grand Duchy of Lithuania
History of Lithuania (1219–1569)
13th-century conflicts
13th century in the Mongol Empire
13th century in Lithuania